Ballad of the Broken Seas is an album by Isobel Campbell and Mark Lanegan, their first collaboration.  It made the shortlist for the 2006 Mercury Music Prize and was one of NME's top one hundred albums of the decade.

The Mercury nomination provoked some criticism, as Lanegan was American and the award is for British and Irish artists only. However, Campbell wrote most of the tracks and produced the album. Campbell had written the music and some of the lyrics before sending it to Lanegan.

Track listing

Personnel
 Mark Lanegan - vocals
 Isobel Campbell - vocals, piano, cello, harpsichord, tubular bells, glockenspiel
 Alyn Cosker - drums
 Jim McCulloch - guitars
 Ross Hamilton - double bass (1,6-8), bass guitar (4,10,12)
 David Robertson - bodhran (1), percussion (8), congas (9)
 Bill Wells - bass guitar (2,3), piano (4), vibraphone (8)
 John McCusker - solo violin (4)
 Joshua Blanchard - acoustic guitar (5)
 Eddi Nappi - bass guitar (5)
 Norm Block - drums (5)
 Geoff Allen - whip (6)
 Claire Campbell - violin (8)
 Helen Thompson - harp (10)
 Chris Geddes - Hammond organ (12)
 Paul Leonard Morgan - string arrangements (3-5,9-10)

References

2006 albums
Folk rock albums
Isobel Campbell albums
Mark Lanegan albums
V2 Records albums
Vocal duet albums